Ian Pattison is a Scottish writer who lives in Glasgow, best known for writing the 10 series of the sitcom Rab C Nesbitt. He also wrote the 1995 to 1996 sitcom Atletico Partick; the six-episode series Breeze Block starring Tim Healy which aired on BBC Choice in 2002, and he created and co-wrote the sitcom The Crouches, which aired on BBC One from 2003 to 2005. He has written three novels Sweet and Tender Hooligan, Looking at the Stars and A Stranger Here Myself, the latter being Rab C Nesbitt's 'autobiography.'

References

Year of birth missing (living people)
Living people
Scottish writers